Primary Health Properties plc is a British-based real estate investment trust, specialising in the rental of flexible and modern primary healthcare facilities within the United Kingdom and Ireland. The company is listed on the London Stock Exchange and is also a constituent of the FTSE 250 Index

History
The company was incorporated in 1995, floated on the Alternative Investment Market in 1996, and listed on the London Stock Exchange in November 1998. The firm switched to Real Estate Investment Trust status when REITs were introduced in the United Kingdom in January 2007.

In September 2018 it bought an accommodation block next to Wansbeck General Hospital in September 2018, and also acquired Jellia Holdings, the owner of three purpose-built primary care centres in Navan Road, Dublin, Newbridge, County Kildare and Celbridge.

In June 2019 PHP completed a £1 billion merger with Medicx Fund, creating the UK’s largest UK healthcare property investor, with a combined portfolio of almost 500 properties.

In 2020 it raised £140 million through a placing of 96.6 million shares to fund future acquisitions.

In 2022 it bought Chiswick Medical Centre, which is let to HCA International Ltd, in London for £34.5 million.

Property portfolio
Approximately 90% of the rent roll was paid for by the NHS in 2017.  9% is due from pharmacies. The company had a portfolio of 513 properties worth £2.8 billion as at 31 December 2022.

Notes

External links 
 Official site
 

Companies listed on the London Stock Exchange
Real estate companies established in 1995
Real estate investment trusts of the United Kingdom
Primary care